Omabe Festival is a special kind of festival that differs from most festivals that are celebrated annually, this Omabe festival is celebrated every five years interval. The festival is a treasure to the people of Imufu community, NSUKKA region, Ezike in Enugu state, Nigeria.The festival has been in existence for several centuries and meant a lot to the Imufu people as it also stand as an omen of purification and purging the community from evil. It is believed that the Masquerade bearer stands as the spiritual intermediate, and the masquerade when it comes out purges the community from evil both in human and spiritual because it is seen to appear with fire, the community has more than one masquerade, which some of them are: eshiwe, obele monwu, Oshagenyi, Eji, eshiwe, Mgbedike, mukwu monwu, Ajulaka, Agbe-Eji, Ajija, Agelle. The community is said to have about 600 masquerades.

Festivity 
The festival always start early in the day, as early as 5am, at this time masquerades are seen coming out to demonstrate. The order to which they come out is from the smaller to the bigger masquerades. The masquerades take over the street as a symbol of the return of the Omabe festival after five years, the energetic demonstrations of the masquerades reveals how they have awaited the festival due to its long interval. They perform and entertain people, sharing them up with different styles and dance steps as well as magic or tricks to make people wonder. After the smaller masquerades performance the bigger masquerades comes out to continue the show. At the noon of the day the dangerous masquerades comes out as the are said to be moved by certain spirits but they are surrounded by the friendly masquerades to avoid them beating, pursuing people and causing havoc.

Some masquerades as Mgbdike appears in a very colorful traditional attire, beads, Animal skins as they are recognized as bigger masquerades, it march through the community when other smaller masquerades follow suit dramatizing. Sounds are heard from near and far from the festival arena, sounds of drums, gong, flutes, voices and other traditional musical  instruments. Later, the masquerades goes straight to the eldest mans house to pay homage.

Since Masquerades are considered as spirit in Imufu, so they are allowed to move and operate for one year from the festival day as the elders says it takes one year for the spirit to leave with men before departing to the spirit world until the next five years. This is a believe that there ancestors comes to live with them for a year and the community experiences peace and unity afterward.  

Females are not allow to come close to the masquerades as they are considered to possess mystical powers.

References 

Festivals in Nigeria